The 1917 Nebraska Cornhuskers football team represented the University of Nebraska in the 1917 college football season. The team was coached by second-year head coach E. J. Stewart and played its home games at Nebraska Field in Lincoln, Nebraska. They competed as members of the Missouri Valley Conference, which NU won for the eighth consecutive season.

Stewart departed the football program after the season to assist in the war effort as the United States drew closer to involvement in World War I, spending time at the YMCA preparing young men to serve in the armed forces. Stewart remained NU's basketball coach and athletic director until 1919.

Schedule

Coaching staff

Roster

Game summaries

Nebraska Wesleyan

Sources:

This was the fourth and final time Nebraska scored 100 or more points.

Iowa

Sources:

Notre Dame

Sources:

The Irish's longest drive ended with an interception at the Nebraska 8-yard line. Among the Notre Dame players present was future College Football Hall of Fame inductee George Gipp, who was handed his first career loss at Notre Dame.

at Michigan

Sources:

Missouri

Sources:

Kansas

Sources:

Syracuse

Sources:

References

Nebraska
Nebraska Cornhuskers football seasons
Missouri Valley Conference football champion seasons
Nebraska Cornhuskers football